Sagramoro Sagramori (died 1482) was a Roman Catholic prelate who served as Bishop of Parma (1476–1482) and Bishop of Piacenza (1475–1476).

Biography
On 21 Oct 1475, Sagramoro Sagramori was appointed during the papacy of Pope Sixtus IV as Bishop of Piacenza.
On 15 Jan 1476, he was appointed during the papacy of Pope Sixtus IV as Bishop of Parma.
He served as Bishop of Parma until his death on 25 Aug 1482.

References

External links and additional sources
 (for Chronology of Bishops) 
 (for Chronology of Bishops) 
 (for Chronology of Bishops) 
 (for Chronology of Bishops) 

15th-century Italian Roman Catholic bishops
Bishops appointed by Pope Sixtus IV
1482 deaths